Patrick Millington Synge  (1910-1982) was a British botanist, writer and plant hunter.

Career

He was a graduate of Corpus Christi College, University of Cambridge. His first book documented a British Museum Natural History expedition to East Africa, led by George Taylor, later Director at Royal Botanic Gardens, Kew. He fought in the Intelligence Corps in the Second World War between 1943 and 1945, gaining the rank of Major. He was editor of the Horticultural Journal between 1945 and 1970 and was awarded the Victoria Medal of the Royal Horticultural Society in 1971. His many expeditions, including those to Nepal with
Colville Barclay and Turkey with Rear-Admiral Paul Furse were documented in his 1973 book In Search of Flowers. He died in 1982.

Publications
 Mountains of the Moon: an expedition to the Equatorial Mountains of Africa. Drummond/Travel Book Club; Patrick M. Synge (1938)
 Great Flower Books, 1700-1900: a bibliographical record of two centuries of finely-illustrated flower books. London: Collins (1956), Sacheverell Sitwell & Wilfrid Blunt; bibliography by Patrick M. Synge
--do.--Atlantic Monthly Press (1990) 
 Collins Guide to Bulbs. London: Collins. Patrick Millington Synge (1961)
 Dictionary of Roses in Colour. London: Michael Joseph & Ebury Press, S. Millar Gault, Patrick M. Synge (1971)
 In Search of Flowers. London: Michael Joseph, Patrick Millington Synge (1973)
 Flowers and Colour in Winter. London: Michael Joseph, Patrick M. Synge (1974)
 The Dictionary of Garden Plants in Colour. London: Michael Joseph, Patrick Millington Synge, Roy Hay (1976)
 The Gardens of Britain; Vol. 1: Devon and Cornwall. London:  B. T. Batsford in assoc. with Royal Horticultural Society. Patrick M. Synge (1977) 
 Lilies: a revision of Elwes' Monograph of the Genus Lilium and its supplements. London: B. T. Batsford. Patrick M. Synge (1980) 
Borneo Jungle with Tom Harrisson et al.
Plants with Personality
A Diversity of Plants
The Royal Horticultural Society Dictionary of Gardening and supplements; contributor

Royal Horticultural Society accepted plant names
 Abutilon X Patrick Synge
 Abutilon X Patrick Synge variagated (v)

Notes

References
Patrick Synge - The Plant Hunter, The Best of British Magazine, January 2011: pp. 30–31

1910 births
1982 deaths
English horticulturists
English book editors
English garden writers
Plant collectors
20th-century British botanists
Victoria Medal of Honour recipients
English male non-fiction writers
Patrick
20th-century English male writers